Saturday Nights & Sunday Mornings is the fifth studio album by American rock band Counting Crows, released in the United States on March 25, 2008. It is thematically divided into two sides: the rock music of Saturday Nights and the more country-influenced Sunday Mornings. Vocalist and lyricist Adam Duritz states that the album "is about really wanting to mean something and failing to do it. You want your life to mean something. You want to be somebody and then what you turn out to be is so much less than what you thought you were going to be."

The Saturday Nights portion was produced by Gil Norton (who also produced the band's second album, Recovering the Satellites), while Sunday Mornings was produced by Brian Deck, perhaps best known for his production work on Modest Mouse's album The Moon and Antarctica.

The album debuted at number 3 on the Billboard 200, the band's highest peak since Recovering the Satellites and it sold 106,000 copies in first week. The cover depicts the Empire State Building in New York City.

Recording

After aggressively touring for five years, lead singer Adam Duritz explained he had, emotionally and physically, reached a nadir:

However, Duritz acknowledged that, upon listening to "1492" (then an out-take from the Hard Candy sessions) that he began thinking: "There's this album here":

After initial slow progress, Duritz has mentioned that, realizing Gil Norton was scheduled to produce the Foo Fighters' record "Echoes, Silence, Patience and Grace" at the beginning of March, the band agreed to reconvene with Norton for another several weeks to complete the material at hand.

Despite the band initially intending to release a single album under the "Saturday Nights" concept, Duritz began contemplating a companion piece for the record as they were finalizing their existing material:

Duritz claimed the band's decision to draft Brian Deck as the producer for the "Sunday Mornings" half of the record came out of frequent Internet research:

After some initial studio sessions and brainstorming, Duritz then realized a thematic significance and cohesion of the two records:

Duritz also described the recording process for "You Can't Count On Me":

From mid-March through mid-April 2007, the band recorded "Sunday Mornings" in Berkeley. After Duritz took a two-week break, the band would reconvene with their engineer James Brown to mix the "Saturday Nights" half of the record from late-April to mid-May, followed finally by over three weeks of intensive mixing of "Sunday Mornings" throughout the remainder of May 2007. By early June the album was mastered.
The album was the first album in which featured Jonah Soucy the nephew at the time of Band Manager Joel Soucy. This was one of 2 albums Jonah was featured on.

Release

Initially, the band planned on releasing "Saturday Nights and Sunday Mornings" in November 2007. However, Duritz directly requested to Geffen Records to postpone the album's release until early 2008, citing the lack of promotional preparation including the selection of a single and album photography as the reasoning to do so. The label agreed, and the album's release date was moved back to March 25, 2008.

The album was also the #1 Amazon.com download upon its original release, additionally mentioned while performing on The View by Whoopi Goldberg (a friend of Adam Duritz).

Singles

On January 16, 2008, the band released a digital single as a free download on their official website. It comprises the songs "1492" (as the A-side) and "When I Dream of Michelangelo" (as the B-side). The latter song appeared at the end of an episode of the ABC series Brothers & Sisters.

The lead commercial single, "You Can't Count on Me," was released to radio on February 4, 2008. A music video for the song was released on March 20, 2008. It would go on to peak at No. 2 on Billboard's Adult Alternative chart (also known as the Triple A format), held off the top spot by R.E.M's "Supernatural Superserious" and briefly charted on the Billboard Hot Adult Contemporary Singles chart, peaking at No. 35.

While there has been no follow-up physical single releases, two album tracks have been serviced as airplay singles to the Adult Alternative format; both of which have enjoyed strong airplay. "Come Around" first charted the format in summer of 2008, and went on to top the chart the week of September 19, 2008 (it remained the #1 single for four weeks). A third track, "When I Dream of Michelangelo" (previously released as half of the "digital 45" that preceded the release of the album) would make its first chart appearance on the Adult Alternative chart in December 2008, and has since peaked at No. 7.

Track listing
All songs written by Adam Duritz except where noted.

Saturday Nights

All songs produced by Gil Norton except where noted.
"1492" – 3:50 (produced by Norton and Steve Lillywhite)
"Hanging Tree" (Duritz, Dan Vickrey) – 3:50
"Los Angeles" (Duritz, Ryan Adams, Dave Gibbs) – 4:40
"Sundays" – 4:21 (produced by Norton, Dennis Herring, and David Lowery)
"Insignificant" (Duritz, Vickrey, Charles Gillingham, David Immerglück) – 4:14
"Cowboys" – 5:22

Sunday Mornings

All songs produced by Brian Deck except where noted.
"Washington Square" – 4:17
"On Almost Any Sunday Morning" – 2:58
"When I Dream of Michelangelo" (Duritz, Gillingham, Immerglück, Vickrey) – 3:10
"Anyone But You" (Duritz, Gillingham, Immerglück) – 5:25
"You Can't Count on Me" – 3:16
"Le Ballet D'or" (Duritz, Gillingham, Immerglück) – 5:01
"On a Tuesday in Amsterdam Long Ago" (Duritz, Gillingham) – 4:57
"Come Around" (Duritz, Vickrey) – 4:31 (produced by Norton)

Dutch bonus track
"Wennen aan September" (acoustic; featuring Bløf)

UK bonus track
"Baby, I'm a Big Star Now" – 5:59

iTunes Store bonus tracks
"There Goes Everything" (Duritz, Immerglück)
"Come Around" (acoustic version)
"Sessions" (Duritz, Gillingham, Immerglück) – 4:17
"Sunday Morning L.A." (Duritz, Gillingham, Immerglück) – 5:48

The iTunes Store version also includes a track-by-track interview with Duritz.

Personnel
Counting Crows
Jim Bogios – drums, sleigh bells, tambourine, maracas, percussion, vocals
David Bryson – guitar, vocals
Adam Duritz – vocals
Charlie Gillingham – keyboards, vocals
David Immergluck – guitar, vocals
Millard Powers – bass guitar, upright double bass, vocals
Dan Vickrey – guitar, banjo, keyboard, vocals

Additional musicians
Brian Deck – piano plucking
Dave Gibbs – vocal arrangements and backing vocals on "Los Angeles"
Dennis Herring – dobro, acoustic guitar on "Sundays"
Matt Malley – bass guitar on "Sundays" and "Baby, I'm a Big Star Now"
Ben Mize – drums on "Los Angeles", "Sundays" and "Baby, I'm a Big Star Now"

Production
Brian Deck – Sunday Mornings (except "Come Around")
Dennis Herring – co-production on "Sundays"
Steve Lillywhite – co-production on "1492"
David Lowery – co-production on "Sundays"
Gil Norton – Saturday Nights and "Come Around", co-production on "1492" and "Sundays"

Charts

Weekly charts

Year-end charts

Singles

References

External links

2008 albums
Albums produced by Gil Norton
Albums produced by Steve Lillywhite
Counting Crows albums
Geffen Records albums
Concept albums
Albums produced by Brian Deck